Sunzha is a town and the administrative center of the Sunzhensky District of the Republic of Ingushetia Russia. Before 2016  it was called Ordzhonikidzevskaya (Ordzhonikidzevski; КӀурий-Юрт, Quriy-Yurt).

Population:  As of the 2010 Census, it was the most populous rural locality in Russia.

Geography 
Historically, the town was laid on the northern bank of the river, however, currently both banks are inhabited.

Sunzhensky ridge is situated to the north of the town. To the west, Sunzha borders Troitskya, on the east Sernovosky of the Sunzhensky District of Chechnya.  to the south lies Nesterovskaya.

The train station Sleptsovkaya of the North Caucasian railway is the last stop on the trail. The railway connection between Sunzha and Grozny existed before the military conflict in Chechnya, however, in the 1990s the railways had been damaged and consequently destroyed.

Climate
Sunzha has a humid continental climate (Köppen climate classification: Dfa).

Notable people 

 Zarifa Sautieva, activist
 Movsar Evloev, mixed martial artist

History 

The establishment of the early settlement is associated with the Ingush highlanders moving from the Assinkoe gorge to the plains. In 18th century Ingush highlanders established settlements in the modern Sunzhensky district of Ingushetia. According to the maps of 1834, several Ingush settlements are known to the area, including Kurei-Yurt which was lying on the modern boundaries of the town of Sunzha.  According to the rapport by the Vladikavkaz commandant the population of village Kurai-Yurt was 585 people, which was considered to be a relatively large settlement. The other sources acknowledge the village under the name of Korei-Yurd, such as on the "Map of left flank of the Caucausian line" in 1840.

The founder of the village was Kuri, the son of Ali ), from the Leimi village of the mountainous Dzheirakhski district of Ingushetia. In the late 20s of the XIX, he moved from his native Leimi and established Kuri-Yurt which existed until 1845, where it was destroyed during the Russian colonization, which established Sunzha line of cossacks settlements on the sights of villages of the indigenous population. During the Russian Empire, the town was the administrative capital of the Sunzhensky Otdel of the Terek Oblast.

In 1845, during the Caucasian war,  stanitsa Sunzhenskay has been established as a part of Sunzha cossack line. The stanitsas were inhabited by settlers from already existing cossack settlements in the Caucasus, as well as Don cossacks.

References

Bibliography 
 
 

Cities and towns in Ingushetia